Dyspessa artemis is a moth in the family Cossidae. It was described by Yakovlev in 2008. It is found in Turkey.

References

Natural History Museum Lepidoptera generic names catalog

Moths described in 2008
Dyspessa
Moths of Asia